Satirical cartography is a form of art, exposing stereotypes and political messages with comical geopolitical illustrations. Satirical cartography dates back to the late 18th century and early 19th century. Hanna Humphrey and Frederick W. Rose are among the earliest pioneers in cartoon-ish maps.

In some cases, satirical cartography is meant to critique places and peoples or alternatively the stereotypes forming around given places and peoples.

References

 
Visualization (graphics)
Cartography